Thailand first participated at the Olympic Games in 1952, and has sent athletes to compete in every Summer Olympic Games since then, except when they participated in the US-led boycott of the 1980 Summer Olympics. Thailand has also participated in the Winter Olympic Games since 2002.

Thailand won its first medal at the 1976 Games in Montreal, when boxer Payao Poontarat took home a bronze in the Men's Light Flyweight category. Thailand's first gold medal would also come in boxing at the 1996 Games in Atlanta, when Somluck Kamsing won the Men's Featherweight category. Since then, Thai athletes have won gold medals at every subsequent Summer Olympics with the exception of the 2012 Games in London, with all its gold medals to date having come in men's boxing, women's weightlifting and women’s taekwondo.

The National Olympic Committee for Thailand was created in 1948 and recognized in 1950.

As of 2021, Thai athletes have won a total of 35 medals, fourteen in weightlifting, 15 in boxing and 6 in taekwondo. Among countries in Southeast Asia, Thailand ranks first in terms of the number of gold medals (10), and second in the number of overall medals (35), only behind Indonesia which has 37 medals. Thailand's most successful Games to date were the 2004 Games in Athens, where they won eight medals, of which three of them were gold.

The country's most recent gold medalist is Panipak Wongpattanakit, who earned her medal in the women's 49kg event in taekwondo.

Medals

Medals by Summer Games

Medals by Winter Games

Medals by Summer Sport

Medals by Winter Sport

List of medalists

Medals by individual
According to official data of the International Olympic Committee. This is a list of people who have won two or more Olympic medals for Thailand. 

People in bold are still active competitors

Flag bearers

Flag bearers by Summer Games

Flag bearers by Winter Games

Olympic participants

Summer Olympics

Winter Olympics

Milestones
 In 2002 and 2006, Thailand qualified its first Winter Olympian cross country skier, and first Winter Olympian, Prawat Nagvajara.
 In 2014, Thailand qualified its first Winter Olympian alpine skier, Kanes Sucharitakul. It then added the first female Winter Olympian for the country, Vanessa Vanakorn (Vanessa-Mae), doubling the size of the previous largest delegation to a Winter Games.

See also
 Tropical nations at the Winter Olympics

 Olympics
 Thailand at the Youth Olympics
 Paralympic
 Thailand at the Paralympics
 Asian Games
 Thailand at the Asian Games
 Thailand at the Asian Para Games

 Other
 Thailand at the Universiade
 Thailand at the World Games

References

External links